Murphy Lake is a  lake in Hamilton County, New York, United States.
 
In 2008, the lake, in the town of Hope was stocked with brook trout to sustain its natural population.

References

Lakes of New York (state)
Protected areas of Hamilton County, New York
Lakes of Hamilton County, New York